The 1932 Winter Olympics, officially known as the III Olympic Winter Games and commonly known as Lake Placid 1932, were a winter multi-sport event in the United States, held in Lake Placid, New York, United States. The games opened on February 4 and closed on February 13. It was the first of four Winter Olympics held in the United States; Lake Placid hosted again in 1980.

The games were awarded to Lake Placid in part by the efforts of Godfrey Dewey, head of the Lake Placid Club and son of Melvil Dewey, inventor of the Dewey Decimal System.  California also had a bid for the 1932 Winter Games. William May Garland, president of the California X Olympiad Association, wanted the games to take place in Wrightwood and Big Pines, California.  The world's largest ski jump at the time was constructed in Big Pines for the event, but the games were ultimately awarded to Lake Placid.

Highlights
 American company Coca-Cola became the official provider of that games' soft drinks and would remain so for all subsequent winter Olympics (as of 2021).
 The Games were opened by Franklin D. Roosevelt, then the Governor of New York.  He would be elected President of the United States nine months later.
 The victory podium was used for the first time at the winter games. Speed skater Jack Shea became the first Olympic champion to receive a gold medal on the podium. 
 Billy Fiske (who would win his second gold medal at Lake Placid, having won his first at 16 in the 1928 Winter Olympics), carried the flag for the United States in the opening ceremonies. A planner of a winter resort in Aspen, Colorado, he was killed in 1940 flying in the Battle of Britain.
 Sonja Henie won the second of three consecutive Olympic gold medals in figure skating. She also won gold in 1928 and 1936.
 Eddie Eagan became the only Olympian to win gold medals at both the summer and winter games in different sports. He won gold in boxing in the 1920 Antwerp summer games and gold in bobsleigh at Lake Placid. The bobsleigh race was held two days after the games' closing ceremonies due to unseasonably warm weather in the region the week prior. 
Georg Gyssling, a card-carrying member of the Nazi party, joined a newly created four man bobsledding team after half the German team was injured in several violent crashes on Mount Van Hoevenberg. René Fonjallaz, a future Nazi propagandist on the Swiss team, was also injured and left unconscious for five minutes after a crash during a practice run. 
 The United States topped the medal count with a total of 12 medals (6 gold, 4 silver, and 2 bronze). This was the only time the U.S. led the overall medal standings at the Winter Olympics until the 2010 Games in Vancouver, and the only time the United States won the most gold medals.
 Seventeen countries participated.

Events

Medals were awarded in 14 events contested in 4 sports (7 disciplines).

Skating

Demonstration sports
The Games also included events in three demonstration sports.
 Curling
 Sled dog race
 Speed skating (women)

Venues

Participating nations

Athletes from 17 nations competed in these Games, down from 25 nations at the previous Games in 1928.  Argentina, Estonia, Latvia, Lithuania, Luxembourg, Mexico, the Netherlands, and Yugoslavia did not send athletes to Lake Placid.

Number of athletes by National Olympic Committees

<noinclude>

Medal count

Podium sweeps

See also

References

External links

 
 III Olympic Winter Games Lake Placid 1932, 1932 The official report.
 Lake Placid Olympic Authority
 The program of the 1932 Lake Placid Winter Olympics

 
Winter Olympics by year
Olympic Games in the United States
Winter multi-sport events in the United States
Olympic Games in New York (state)
Olympics
Olympics
Olympics, Winter
Olympics
February 1932 sports events